As of June 2013, there are 192 parties to the Kyoto Protocol to the United Nations Framework Convention on Climate Change, which aims to combat global warming. This total includes 191 states (189 United Nations member states as well as the Cook Islands and Niue) and one supranational union (the European Union). Canada renounced the protocol effective 15 December 2012 and ceased to be a member from that date.

With the Protocol's 2008-2012 commitment period expiring, the Doha Amendment to the Kyoto Protocol was agreed to, which establishes new commitments for the period 2013–2020.  As of October 2020, 147 states have accepted this amendment.

Parties
Signing is optional, indicating an intention to ratify the Protocol. Ratification means that a state is legally bound by the provisions of the treaty. For Annex I parties (e.g. a developed state or one with an 'economy in transition') this means that it has agreed to cap emissions in accordance with the Protocol.

Iceland was the 55th state to ratify, fulfilling the first condition for coming-into-force.  With Russia's ratification the "55 percent of 1990 carbon dioxide emissions of the Parties included in Annex I" clause was satisfied and the treaty was brought into force, effective 16 February 2005.  As of October 2020, 147 states have accepted the Doha amendment.  It will enter into force as of 31 December 2020.

Former parties

Signatory

Not signatories or parties
As of 2022 there are four UN member states or observers which are not party to the protocol, all of which are members of the UNFCCC: Andorra, Holy See, Palestine, South Sudan.

Notes

References

Climate change policy
Kyoto
Kyoto Protocol